The Sunday Times Rich List 2015 is the 27th annual survey of the wealthiest people resident in the United Kingdom, published by The Sunday Times on 26 April 2015.

The Guardian reported that the collective wealth of Britain’s 1,000 richest people had more than doubled in the last 10 years with a combined fortune of just over £547bn and a fortune of £100m was now required to qualify for the list.

This year's list marked the first year Queen Elizabeth II was not among the list's top 300 most wealthy since the list began in 1989. In the Sunday Times Rich List 1989, The Queen had been ranked number one in the United Kingdom, with a net worth of £5.2 billion, which included state assets that were not hers personally, (approximately £ in today's value).

Top 15 fortunes

See also 
 Forbes list of billionaires

References

External links 
 Sunday Times Rich List

Sunday Times Rich List
2015 in the United Kingdom